Alison Gilliland (born 1968) is an Irish Labour Party politician who served as Lord Mayor of Dublin from 2021 to 2022.

In June 2021, she was elected as the 353rd Lord Mayor of Dublin, succeeding Hazel Chu. Gilliland was elected unopposed, and supported by the Labour Party, Fianna Fáil, Green Party, and the Social Democrats. She was elected to Dublin City Council for the Artane-Whitehall local electoral area in 2014. She has chaired the DCC Strategic Policy Committee (SPC) on Housing and a member of the Finance SPC, and has sat as an alternate member to the European Committee of the Regions and on the Commission for Citizenship, Governance, Institutional and External Affairs (CIVEX). 

Gilliland is a former primary school teacher and a full-time official with the INTO.  She led the INTO Learning Section and was their Equality Officer, supporting the union’s Equality Committee and working on issues pertaining to LGBT+ inclusion, racial, ethnic and cultural diversity and member reproductive health related matters. She represented INTO on the Irish Congress of Trade Union’s Women’s Committee and on the European Trade Union Committee for Education’s Standing Committee for Equality, and was a member of the Advisory Group leading the ETUCE's Embracing Diversity in Education project.

Early life and education
Gilliland was born in Drogheda, County Louth, and grew up in Ballybay, County Monaghan. She graduated with a Bachelor of Education from Church of Ireland College of Education awarded by Trinity College Dublin, a Master of Education from Dublin City University, and a Doctor of Education from the University of Nottingham.

References

External links
Labour Party profile

1968 births
Living people
Alumni of Dublin City University
Alumni of the Church of Ireland College of Education
Alumni of the University of Nottingham
Irish trade unionists
Irish schoolteachers
Labour Party (Ireland) politicians
Lord Mayors of Dublin
People from Drogheda
Politicians from County Monaghan